Three Wise Men is a 2016 Nigerian comedy drama film, produced and directed by Opa Williams and Pat Ogbere Imobhio respectively. The film premiered to a select audience on December 4, 2016 with several notable film practitioners in attendance. The film tells a story of the social adventures of three elderly men, who seek to have fun after getting their pension from the government.

Synopsis 
Irikele (Richard Mofe Damijo) is an extroverted pensioner, who is very experienced in dealing with women and the younger generations. He tries to influence his friends to indulge in his sexual and emotional experiences. He has been divorced severally, and was threatened with death by two of his irresponsible sons, who felt he was being selfish with his wealth.

Timi (Zack Orji) is a friend of Irikele, who is married to an extremely religious women, he shares similarly ideologies over the fantasies of Irikele but often needs someone to push and encourage him before making real moves, however as the film progresses he became more comfortable with that lifestyle.

Tobere (Victor Olaotan) is the most principled among the three friends. He loves his wife and wouldn't do anything to hurt her. However, with peer pressure from his two friends who don't seem to share his moral beliefs, it became increasingly difficult for him to uphold them.

Cast 
Richard Mofe Damijo as Irikele
Zack Orji as Timi
Victor Olaotan as Tobere
Tina Mba as Regina
Ebele Okaro as Yetunde
Rotimi Salami as Oke

Reception 
Wilfred Okiche for 360nobs praised the acting of the main cast, with particular acclaim for Richard Mofe Damijo, describing the film as genuinely funny, but downplayed the roles the leading women were made to play in the film as cliche. It noted that "Tobere" has gotten so engrossed to his role in Tinsel (TV series), that it was difficult for him to play a character opposite of what "Ade Williams" represented in the series. It concluded its review by stating that the last 10 minutes of the film were completely unnecessary and a total detach from the remaining parts off the film. Joy Dibia for Xplorenollywood also criticized the unneeded evangelical nature of the latter parts of the film, although she rated it an 8 out of 10 for its genuinely comedic theme and powerful acting. True Nollywood Stories titled its review "Opa Williams returns to filmmaking with an eyesore".

References 

Nigerian comedy-drama films
Films shot in Nigeria
Films about old age
2016 comedy-drama films
2010s English-language films
English-language Nigerian films